The Big Willow River is a river in northeastern Kenora District in northwestern Ontario, Canada. It is a tributary of James Bay.

The Big Willow River begins in muskeg and flows north-northeast to its mouth at James Bay.

References

Sources

"Big Willow River" at Atlas of Canada. Accessed 2016-04-24.

Rivers of Kenora District
Tributaries of James Bay